Ayman Al-Khulaif (born 22 May 1997) is a Saudi Arabian footballer who plays as a midfielder for Al-Fateh and the Saudi Arabia national team.

External links

References

1997 births
Living people
People from Al-Hasa
Association football midfielders
Saudi Arabian footballers
Saudi Arabia international footballers
Saudi Arabia youth international footballers
Hajer FC players
Al-Ahli Saudi FC players
Al-Wehda Club (Mecca) players
Al-Fateh SC players
Saudi Professional League players
Saudi First Division League players
Footballers at the 2018 Asian Games
2019 AFC Asian Cup players
Asian Games competitors for Saudi Arabia
Olympic footballers of Saudi Arabia
Footballers at the 2020 Summer Olympics
21st-century Saudi Arabian people